Angel Wings is the eighth Mandarin studio album of Taiwanese Mandopop artist Rainie Yang. The album was released on 23 August 2013 by Sony Music Taiwan in three editions: regular, Love Letter Edition and Fantasy Land Edition. A special edition (天使之翼冠軍慶功熊抱版) was released on 20 September 2013, which includes a new 28-page photo lyric booklet, postcards and magnet.

Track listing

Music videos

References

External links 
 Rainie Yang@Sony Music Taiwan 
 Rainie Yang discography@Sony Music Taiwan 

2013 albums
Rainie Yang albums
Sony Music Taiwan albums